Ben Platt (born 1993) is an American film and stage actor.

Ben Platt may also refer to:
Ben Platt (cricketer) (born 1980), Welsh cricketer
Benjamin Platt (c. 1883–1960), American businessman and philanthropist